Brock D. Spack (born January 5, 1962) is an American football coach.  He is the head football coach at Illinois State University, position he has held since December 2008. Previously, he was the defensive coordinator at Purdue University under Joe Tiller.

College career
Spack played linebacker at Purdue from 1980 to 1983, earning first-team All-Big Ten and honorable mention All-America honors as a sophomore. He was a three-year starter and currently ranks fifth on the Boilermakers' career tackles list with 384. He graduated from Purdue in 1984 with a bachelor's degree in social studies and earned a master's degree in physical education from Eastern Illinois University in 1990.

Coaching career
After graduation, he was a graduate assistant in football at Purdue for the 1984 & 1985 seasons, where he worked with Joe Tiller (defensive coordinator) and Jim Colletto (offensive coordinator) under head coach Leon Burtnett.  When Jim Colletto was hired to replace Fred Akers after the 1990 season, he retained Brock as a defensive coach from 1991–1994.  For the 1995 season, Joe Tiller hired Brock Spack as defensive coordinator at Wyoming, where he coached two seasons before following Joe Tiller to Purdue in 1997 and remained defensive coordinator until 2008.

In the 2008 season, Danny Hope was hired to return to Purdue to become head coach in 2009 upon Joe Tiller's retirement.  Spack had interviewed for the position, but Hope had the edge with head coaching experience that Spack lacked.  Spack coached with Hope during the 2008 season under Tiller and had indicated his intention to stay on Hope's staff, but ultimately, when offered a head coaching position at Illinois State, Spack decided to leave his alma mater starting with the 2009 season.

During the 2021 season, Spack became the winningest coach in Illinois State history; passing Edwin Struck's mark of 86 wins.

A native of Rockford, Ill., Spack and his wife, Aimee, a former Purdue cheerleader, have two children, Alicia who played softball for Purdue  and Brent, who was a linebacker for Illinois State.

Head coaching record

References

External links
 Illinois State profile

1962 births
Living people
American football linebackers
Eastern Illinois Panthers football coaches
Illinois State Redbirds football coaches
Purdue Boilermakers football coaches
Purdue Boilermakers football players
Wabash Little Giants football coaches
Wyoming Cowboys football coaches
Sportspeople from Rockford, Illinois
Coaches of American football from Illinois
Players of American football from Illinois